Bill Shortt (13 October 1920 – 20 September 2004) was a Welsh professional footballer who played as a goalkeeper. He was born in Wrexham and was capped 12 times by Wales.

Playing career
Shortt joined Chester on amateur terms in 1938 after being spotted playing for local side Hoole Alex., signing a professional contract the following May after a loan spell with Wellington.

Although Shortt officially never played a Football League match for Chester, he was a regular for the first-team throughout the war years. He made his debut in the club's first wartime league match against Tranmere Rovers in October 1939 and played his final match against Rochdale in January 1946, shortly before moving to Division Two side Plymouth Argyle for £1,000.

Shortt went on to make more than 300 league appearances for Argyle over the next decade, helping them win the Football League Division Three South title in 1951–52. His stint also saw him capped 12 times by Wales, with his first cap coming against Northern Ireland in April 1947. The following season saw him return to Chester with Plymouth in the FA Cup third round, but he was on the losing side as Chester recorded a 2–0 victory.

After leaving Plymouth in 1956, Shortt ended his professional career. He joined non-league side Tavistock and was the landlord of a pub in Plymouth.

He died on 20 September 2004, the same day as legendary football manager Brian Clough.

Honours
Plymouth Argyle

Football League Division Three South champions: 1951–52 (44 apps)

External links
Chester City obituary
Tribute from a Plymouth Argyle fan
Article on Chester during the Second World War (featuring Bill Shortt)

References

1920 births
2004 deaths
Footballers from Wrexham
Welsh footballers
Wales international footballers
English Football League players
Association football goalkeepers
Chester City F.C. players
Plymouth Argyle F.C. players
Tavistock A.F.C. players
Telford United F.C. players